Larrivée or Larrivee is a French surname. Notable people with the surname include:

Christian Larrivée (born 1982), Canadian ice hockey player
Gaby Larrivée (born 1933), Québécois-Canadian politician
Henri Larrivée (1737–1802), French opera singer
Jean Larrivée (June 6th 1944), Canadian luthier; founder of Jean Larrivée Guitars Ltd.
Leo Larrivee (1903–1928) U.S. Olympian track and field athlete
Ricardo Larrivée (born 1967), Québécois-Canadian television chef
Wayne Larrivee (born ?), U.S. sports broadcaster

French-language surnames